Pierre Chavot (16 August 1956, Paris) is a French author, historian and teacher.

Notes

Works

External links 
 Pierre Chavot on France Culture
 Passerelles entre nos origines et notre monde: Pierre Chavot at TEDxBordeaux on YouTube

21st-century French writers
French historians of religion
Writers from Paris
1956 births
Living people